Dave Pietro (born February 10, 1964) is a saxophonist, woodwind artist,  bandleader, sideman, composer and educator. A native of Southboro, Massachusetts, he has been on the New York City music scene since 1987.

From 1994–2003 Dave played lead alto saxophone and recorded six CDs with the Toshiko Akiyoshi Jazz Orchestra.  He has toured and/or recorded with the bands of Woody Herman, Lionel Hampton, Maynard Ferguson, Maria Schneider, The Village Vanguard Jazz Orchestra, John Fedchock, Mike Holober, Anita Brown, Pete McGuinness, Jim Widner and Arturo O'Farrill.  Pietro has also performed with may other well known musicians such as Paul Anka, Louis Bellson, Blood Sweat & Tears, Bobby Caldwell, Ray Charles, Rosemary Clooney, Harry Connick Jr., Michael Feinstein, Chaka Khan, Liza Minnelli, James Naughton, John Pizzarelli and Dave Matthews Band. Dave also studies East Indian music and has performed with various groups led by Indian tablist Sandip Burman.

As a leader, Dave has released six CDs with musicians such as Dave Holland, Kenny Werner, Ben Monder, Bill Stewart, Brian Blade, Scott Colley, Scott Wendholt, Duduka De Fonseca, Helio Alves and Pete McCann. Now Becoming Then (1999 A-Records) was called a "rich feast for listeners" by Bill Bennett of Jazz Times.  Standard Wonder-The Music of Stevie Wonder (A-Records) was voted one of the top 10 jazz CDs of 2001 by Bob Blumenthal of the Boston Globe and Bill Milkowski of Jazz Times and received 4 stars from Downbeat magazine.   Pietro's fifth CD Embrace: Impressions of Brazil (2004 A-Records) "is a triumph ... one of the most satisfying Brazilian jazz mixes since the first bossa nova tsunami" according to Judith Schlesinger of AllAboutJazz.com.

Dave was selected as a semi-finalist for the first two Thelonious Monk Institute of Jazz International Saxophone Competitions (1991 & 1996) and was a finalist in the 1995 JAZZIZ Magazine "Woodwinds on Fire" talent search.  In 1996 he was the recipient of a grant from the National Endowment for the Arts.  In 2005 and 2007 he received grants from Chamber Music America's New Works Programs to compose and perform his new extended work The Chakra Suite (2008-Challenge).  Featuring Gary Versace, Rez Abbasi, Todd Isler, Johannes Weidenmueller and Adam Cruz it was voted one of the top CDs of 2008 by All About Jazz

Pietro received a bachelor's degree in music education from North Texas State University where he toured and recorded four albums with the school's One O'Clock Lab Band.  He has a Master of Arts degree in jazz composition from New York University where he currently holds the position of Music Assistant Professor of Jazz Studies. Dave has given hundreds of workshops and concerts at schools around the country and is sponsored by Rico Reeds and the Conn-Selmer Instrument Company.

External links
[ All Music]
Dave Pietro's website
Interview on The World Music Foundation Podcast

American jazz saxophonists
American male saxophonists
University of North Texas College of Music alumni
Jazz musicians from Massachusetts
Living people
1964 births
21st-century American saxophonists
21st-century American male musicians
American male jazz musicians
ArtistShare artists